Gwin Stanley Foster (December 25, 1903 – November 25, 1954), also known as Gwen or Gwyn, was an old-time/country harmonica and guitar player who was known for work in The Carolina Tar Heels and the .

He was born in Caldwell, North Carolina, and died in Gastonia, North Carolina,  the son of Joe Foster and Myra Elizabeth (nee Day). He worked in the textile mills, where he met banjoist Coble "Dock" Walsh, and they formed the band.

References

Further references 
Tony Russell: Country Music Originals (2007), S. 111 f.; Oxford University Press,

External links
 

Old-time musicians
American country harmonica players
1903 births
1954 deaths
20th-century American musicians
People from Gastonia, North Carolina
People from Orange County, North Carolina
Country musicians from North Carolina